Donie O'Sullivan (born 1940) is an Irish former Gaelic footballer who played for the Spa club and at senior level for the Kerry county team between 1962 and 1975. He was the recipient of Kerry's first All Star Award in 1971, a feat he repeated in 1972. In 2019, he was inducted into Munster GAA's "hall of fame".

According to a 2019 interview, while studying educational psychology at St. John's University in New York during the 1960s, O'Sullivan was offered a contract by New York Jets coach Weeb Ewbank.

See also
 List of Kerry senior Gaelic football team captains

References

 

1940 births
Living people
All-Ireland-winning captains (football)
All Stars Awards winners (football)
Alumni of University College Dublin
Dr Crokes Gaelic footballers
Gaelic football backs
Irish schoolteachers
Kerry inter-county Gaelic footballers
Munster inter-provincial Gaelic footballers
Spa Gaelic footballers
UCD Gaelic footballers